Jake Bugg (born Jake Edwin Charles Kennedy on 28 February 1994) is an English singer-songwriter. His self-titled debut album, Jake Bugg, some of which was co-written with songwriter Iain Archer, was released in October 2012 and reached number one on the UK Albums Chart. His second album, Shangri La, was released in November 2013 and his third, largely self-produced album On My One, in June 2016. His fourth album Hearts That Strain, a largely acoustic effort, produced by Dan Auerbach, was released in September 2017. After a gap of four years, in August 2021, Bugg released the more pop-influenced fifth album Saturday Night, Sunday Morning.

Early life 
Jake Bugg was born Jake Edwin Charles Kennedy in Nottingham to musical parents who separated when he was young. His father, David Bugg, was a nurse, and his mother worked in sales, both parents having previously made recordings. He grew up in the Clifton council estate of Nottingham and started playing guitar at the age of 12 after being introduced to the instrument by his uncle Mark. He attended Farnborough School Technology College in Clifton. He has described a formative musical moment when, aged 12, he heard Don McLean's "Vincent (Starry, Starry Night)" on an episode of The Simpsons. He was enrolled in a music technology course but, by the age of 16, he had dropped out and was writing and performing his own songs.

Career

2011: Beginnings
Bugg was selected to perform on the "BBC Introducing" stage at the 2011 Glastonbury Festival at age 16 after submitting material to their website, and subsequently signed to Mercury Records. His songs were then placed on various BBC Radio playlists, with "Country Song" being used in a national TV beer commercial for Greene King IPA.

2012: Jake Bugg

Bugg's self-titled debut album was released on 15 October 2012. Talking about Bugg and his debut, Clash hailed the "precocious talent fusing retro folk with  blistering contemporary rock riffs". On 21 October 2012 the song "Two Fingers" charted at 28 in the UK while the album reached number one in the UK charts. The album has sold 604,100 copies in the United Kingdom and is the 57th best selling album of the 2010s decade. Bugg's touring band drummer Jack Atherton and bassist Tom "Robbo" Robertson performed on five songs on the album.

On 22 May 2012, Bugg appeared on the BBC music programme Later... with Jools Holland. In July, he kept a long term promise and performed on legendary radio show "Notts Live", hosted by Bainy and Andy Haynes. In August 2012 Bugg was a supporting act for Noel Gallagher's High Flying Birds at Belsonic Music Festival, Belfast. On 1 October 2012, he performed live on the BBC Radio 6 Music programme Live at Maida Vale. In 2014, "Simple As This" was featured in the movie The Fault in Our Stars

2013: Shangri La

Bugg had been in Malibu working with Rick Rubin and Iain Archer, and had had some interactions with Chad Smith from the Red Hot Chili Peppers, working on the drums to some of his songs, including the single "Broken". On 8 September 2013, Bugg tweeted, "2nd album done! Hope you're all well!" On 23 September 2013, Bugg announced his new album, Shangri La, along with a new single, "What Doesn't Kill You". Shangri La was released on 18 November 2013. This album is named after the studio Bugg recorded it in. Shangri La includes Elvis Costello's drummer Pete Thomas, and Chad Smith of the Red Hot Chili Peppers. The album has generally received positive reviews from the music community. Bugg was one of five nominees for the 2013 Brit Award for "British Breakthrough Act", which was voted on by BBC Radio 1 listeners. The award was won by Ben Howard.

On 28 June, Bugg performed an afternoon set on the Pyramid Stage at the 2013 Glastonbury Festival, making him the first artist that has moved from the BBC Introducing Stage to the Main Pyramid stage in successive years. On 12 July, Bugg played the Radio 1 Stage at T in the Park. On 13 July he supported The Rolling Stones at Hyde Park in London. On 20 July, Bugg headlined at the Splendour festival in Nottingham. On 2 August, Bugg performed at the Osheaga Festival in the Parc Jean-Drapeau, Montreal, Quebec. On 23–25 August, Bugg performed at the Reading and Leeds Festival on the Radio 1/NME stage. On 13 October, Bugg performed at the Fonda Theatre in Hollywood, California. The song "Me and You" was featured in the credits of the movie Dumb and Dumber To. That same month, he was also at the River Stage at Ottawa Bluesfest and performed at Paléo Festival near the Lake Geneva in Switzerland. His music was also featured in the movie The Fault in Our Stars. On 5 October 2014, at Cardiff, he played for the first time two new songs: "Down the Avenue" and "Hold on You". A new song, "Feel What's Good", was in the soundtrack of The Giver.

2016: On My One

Speaking with NME in early 2015, Bugg said that he was working on his third album, of which "the content of the songs was much darker" than earlier work. On the 16 February 2016 he released free of charge a new song: "On My One". On 25 February his new single "Gimme the Love" debuted on BBC Radio 1. Bugg also talked about the forthcoming album On My One, announcing its release for June. On 26 February he announced the album would be released on 17 June. He also shared the track list and revealed the artwork. In May 2016 a number of tour dates, in London and Nottingham, for June, were announced. His 2012 single "Trouble Town" was used as the theme for each of the three BBC TV series Happy Valley broadcast in 2014, 2016 and 2023.

2017: Hearts That Strain

On 2 August 2017, Jake Bugg's new single "How Soon the Dawn" was played on BBC Radio 1, hosted by Annie Mac. On 4 August Bugg released the single on all platforms with a music video. He later announced his fourth studio album titled Hearts That Strain. It was released on 1 September 2017. He will embark on an acoustic tour through November to support the new album. Jake Bugg would also release a piano-laden song with Noah Cyrus called "Waiting".

In December 2018 Bugg signed to Sony's RCA label in a bid to relaunch his career.

2021: Saturday Night, Sunday Morning
On 26 October 2020 issued the single "All I Need". The song followed "Rabbit Hole" and "Saviours Of The City", the latter of which was the Nottingham singer-songwriter's first new music of 2020 when it was shared in April. He accompanied the release with a short film.

On 19 March 2021, it was announced that Bugg would release his fifth album, Saturday Night, Sunday Morning in August 2021, featuring previously released singles "All I Need" and "Kiss Like the Sun". The album, his first effort under the Sony RCA label, is expected to be accompanied by a UK tour in Spring 2022.

Personal life and sponsorship
In April 2013, Bugg was reported to be in a relationship with English model, actress, and singer Cara Delevingne. In 2017, it was reported that Bugg was in a relationship with model Roxy Horner. The couple parted two years later.

In June 2017, Bugg was confirmed as the shirt sponsor of his favourite and local football team, Notts County, taking the November slot in a season-long rotation. In September 2020 the club announced that Bugg would sponsor their away shirt during the 2020–2021 season.

Discography

Studio albums
 Jake Bugg (2012)
 Shangri La (2013)
 On My One (2016)
 Hearts That Strain (2017)
 Saturday Night, Sunday Morning (2021)

Television appearances

Awards and nominations

References

External links

Official website

1994 births
Living people
21st-century English singers
21st-century pianists
English rock guitarists
English rock pianists
English rock singers
English blues guitarists
English male singer-songwriters
Mercury Records artists
Musicians from Nottinghamshire
People from Clifton, Nottinghamshire
21st-century British guitarists
NME Awards winners
Indie folk musicians
English male guitarists
British male pianists
21st-century British male singers